Borkener See is an artificial lake in West Hesse Depression, Hesse, Germany. Created by the mining of lignite coal, the lake is nutrient-poor and slightly basic in pH. The lake and its surrounding area are a habitat of "particular importance as a rest area for water birds and wading birds" and are protected as part of a nature preserve that spans 350 hectares.

References

Lakes of Hesse
Borken, Hesse